The 2008–09 Midland Football Alliance season was the 15th in the history of Midland Football Alliance, a football competition in England.

Clubs and League table
The league featured 19 clubs from the previous season, along with three new clubs:
Bridgnorth Town, promoted from the West Midlands (Regional) League
Coleshill Town, promoted from the Midland Football Combination
Highgate United, promoted from the Midland Football Combination

League Table

References

External links
 Midland Football Alliance

2008–09
9